Hallamölla is the biggest waterfall in Skåne County, Sweden with a height of 23 metres. The waterfall is situated in Tomelilla Municipality, in the Verkeån river 6 km south of Brösarp and 2.5 km north west of Eljaröd. The waterfall is named after its watermill.

Waterfalls of Sweden